Babes in the Wood is a traditional children's tale.

Babes in the Wood may also refer to:

Film and TV
Babes in the Wood (TV series), a British sitcom from 1998 to 1999
Babes in the Woods, a 1932 animated short film in the Silly Symphonies series
"Babes in the Wood", an episode of the animated miniseries Over the Garden Wall

Music
Babes in the Wood, a 1991 album by Mary Black

Other uses
The Babes in the Wood, a novel by Ruth Rendell

See also
Babes in the Wood murders (disambiguation), various events so-called for their resemblances to the traditional tale
Boobs in the Woods 1949 cartoon
Boobs in the Woods (1925 film), a short silent film by Mack Sennett starring Harry Langdon